Makassarese cuisine is the cuisine of Makassarese people of Makassar in the South Sulawesi province of Indonesia.

Dishes
 Coto makassar, a stew made from the mixture of nuts, spices, and selected offal which may include beef brain, tongue and intestine. 
 Pallubasa, a similar dish to Coto Makassar, but with the addition of coconut.
 Konro, a rib dish.
 Burasa or Ketupat, a glutinous rice cake, usually eaten with Coto Makassar and Konro. 
 Ayam goreng sulawesi (Celebes fried chicken); the chicken is marinated with a traditional soy sauce recipe for up to 24 hours before being fried to a golden colour. The dish is usually served with chicken broth, rice and special sambal (chilli sauce).
 Mie kering, a type of dried noodle served with thick gravy and sliced chicken, shrimp, mushrooms, liver, and squid.
 Ikan bolu bakar, grilled milkfish.
 Sop saudara, a spicy beef or buffalo soup.
 Kapurung from Palopo.

Sweets
 Barongko, a banana mashed with egg, coconut milk, sugar, and salt. It is wrapped in the banana leaf and then steamed.
 Pisang epe (pressed banana), a banana which is pressed, grilled, and covered with palm sugar sauce and sometimes eaten with Durian. Many street vendors sell Pisang Epe, especially around the area of Losari beach.
 Pisang ijo (green banana). a banana covered with green-colored flours, coconut milk, and syrup. Pisang Ijo is sometimes served iced, and often consumed as iftar to break the fast during Ramadhan.

Gallery

References

 
 
Indonesian cuisine-related lists